Munir Sarhadi (1931 – May 23, 1980) was a Pashtun-Pakistani instrumentalist, sarinda player and a folk singer. As a musician, he represented Pakistan in several countries. Munir, in 1978 became the recipient of Pride of Performance, a civil award conferred by the Government of Pakistan.

Early life and career
Munir Sarhadi was born in 1931 at Peshawar, Khyber Pakhtunkhwa. He was primarily playing the sarinda despite his parents wishing him to play a non-bowed string instrument. His father refused to teach him the traditional musical instrument in an effort to allow him to play the string instrument besides sarinda. Munir was persistent in his pursuit of sarinda and later became quite good in playing it. He used to perform at many music festivals and music concerts. He was in great demand due to his skills all over Pakistan.

Awards and recognition
 Pride of Performance Award by the Government of Pakistan in 1978.

Death
Munir Sarhadi was passionate about sarinda musical instrument. He didn't earn much from his profession. His only source of income was his job at a broadcast network Radio Pakistan. The salary which was being offered to him, was inadequate to fulfill his medication requirements, and on May 23, 1980, he died in poverty at Peshawar, but died in a dignified manner.

References

External links
 Munir Sarhadi on sarangi.info music website 
 Sarinda instrument with picture on The National Archives of UK

1978 deaths
1931 births
Musicians from Khyber Pakhtunkhwa
People from Peshawar
Pakistani folk singers
Recipients of the Pride of Performance
Sarangi players
Pashto-language singers
Pashtun singers
20th-century Pakistani male singers